The Maryland Senate is the upper house of the Maryland General Assembly, the bicameral state legislature of the U.S. State of Maryland. The Senate comprises 47 elected members from 47 single-member senatorial districts in the state. The Maryland General Assembly is considered one of the oldest continually operating legislative bodies in the United States. The current delegation consists of 35 Democrats (D) and 12 Republicans (R).

Maryland state senators